The Amsterdam Heliport (Dutch: Amsterdam Helihaven)  is a small modern heliport located in the north west of Amsterdam, the Netherlands, in a harbour area known as the Westpoort. It provides parking space outside for four helicopters and hangar space for another three. The heliport was opened in 2005, aiming mainly at VIP transport and airwork. The main user of the heliport is Heli Holland.

References

External links
Airliners.net - Photographs taken at Amsterdam heliport

2005 establishments in the Netherlands
Heliports in the Netherlands
Airports in North Holland
Buildings and structures in Amsterdam
Transport in Amsterdam
21st-century architecture in the Netherlands